Logan Township is one of sixteen townships in Calhoun County, Iowa, United States.  As of the 2000 census, its population was 142.

History
Logan Township was created in 1879. It is named for Gen. John A. Logan.

Geography
According to the USGS, it contains three cemeteries: Logan Township, Piper and Roby.

References

External links
 City-Data.com

Townships in Calhoun County, Iowa
Townships in Iowa